Diacrotricha fasciola (starfruit flowermoth) is a moth of the family Pterophoridae. It is widely distributed throughout south-east Asia.

The larvae feed on Averrhoa carambola and Averrhoa bilimbi. They bore in the flower buds and feed on the flowers. They are considered a serious pest.

References

Pterophorini
Moths of Asia
Moths described in 1851
Taxa named by Philipp Christoph Zeller